Larisa Sokolov (Russian Лариса Соколова) is the wife of Aleksandr S. Sokolov (Russian: Александр С. Соколов) the former Minister of Culture and Mass Communication of Russia. She is a member of the Russian composers union, and has a doctorate in Musicology. Currently the Head Chair of musicology and composition in the Musical Pedagogical Institute.

Early life

Born Larisa Pamfilovna (Russian: Лариса Панфиловна) in Belarus, March 3, 1955 her family relocated to Saint Petersburg where her father was stationed in the army. She studied piano and graduated from the Saint Petersburg Conservatory.

She has two children.

References 

https://web.archive.org/web/20110716070654/http://www.profile.ru/items/?item=10853%3Cbr>
https://web.archive.org/web/20100923032810/http://www.muzobozrenie.ru/exclusive/50-let%3Cbr>
http://www.flb.ru/info/26446.html
http://www.kp.ru/daily/23587.3/44984/
https://web.archive.org/web/20110201045442/http://www.fondculture.ru/site/boss.php%3Cbr>
http://casami.ru/h/1.php

External links
 http://luxury-info.ru/society/news/bolshoi-i-dobrii-million.html
 http://www.fap.ru/index.php?nt=news&id=12455
 http://www.museum.ru/N33875
 http://www.lib.ua-ru.net/diss/cont/177569.html

Russian composers
Living people
Year of birth missing (living people)